Rab'ia ibn Umayah was a companion (Arabic: Sahaba) of Muhammad. His father was  Umayah ibn Khalaf, his mother was Karima bint Ma'mar ibn Habib, and his brother was Safwan ibn Umayya. He helped Muhammad in his The Farewell Sermon and was involved in an episode with during Umar's caliphate:

Rabi'a ibn Umayya was also involved in the Hadith of Umar's speech of forbidding Mut'ah.

See also
Islam

References

Companions of the Prophet
Quraysh